Lale Yavaş (born 1978 in Brugg) is a Swiss and Turkish actress.

Biography
Born in 1978 in Zürich, she studied arts at the University of Bern. After finishing her studies,  she landed roles in Alles wird gut, I was a Swiss banker, and Imbissness.  In 2005, she received a lot of praise for her role in the film Zeit der Wünsche, and was subsequently rewarded with the  Adolf Grimme Prize for best "new cinematic talent". In 2006, she acted in Der Letzte Zug with Gedeon Burkhard. Her latest role is in famous Luxembourgian director Andy Bausch's Deepfrozen opposite actor Peter Lohmeyer.

Since 2005, she has been playing a coroner in the German crime series Tatort produced by Saarländischer Rundfunk.

Selected filmography
2003 — Imbissness
2004 — Das Paar im Kahn
2005 — Zeit der Wünsche (TV) — Melike
2005 — Tatort (TV series)
2006 — Tod eines Keilers
2006 — The Last Train
2006 — Deepfrozen
2006 — Hatırla Sevgili (Turkish TV Series)
2007 — Güzelliğin On Par’ Etmez
2008 —

External links

Lale Yavas - Kurze Vita

1978 births
Living people
Swiss people of Turkish descent
Swiss television actresses
Swiss film actresses
Best Supporting Actress Golden Orange Award winners
University of Bern alumni